Champeaux-sur-Sarthe (literally Champeaux on Sarthe) is a commune in the Orne department in north-western France.

The town covers 9.5 km ² and has 185 people since the last population census from 2005. With a density of 19.5 inhabitants per km ², Champeaux-sur-Sarthe, grew by 4.5% of its population compared with 1999.

See also
Communes of the Orne department

References

Champeauxsursarthe